Witzke is a surname. Notable people with the surname include:

 Lauren Witzke (born 1988), American anti-gay activist and conspiracy theorist
 Lothar Witzke (1895–1962), German naval officer

German-language surnames